Aderito Raul Fernandes (born 15 May 1997), simply known as Aderito, is a football player who currently plays as a goalkeeper for Boavista FC Timor-Leste and the Timor-Leste national football team.

International career
Aderito made his senior international debut in an 8-0 loss to the UAE in the 2018 FIFA World Cup qualification phase on 12 November 2015.

References

1997 births
Living people
Futsal goalkeepers
East Timorese footballers
Timor-Leste international footballers
East Timorese men's futsal players
Association football goalkeepers
Footballers at the 2018 Asian Games
Asian Games competitors for East Timor
Competitors at the 2019 Southeast Asian Games
Southeast Asian Games competitors for East Timor